Daniel Galbraith may refer to:

 Daniel Galbraith (Ontario politician) (1813–1879), Canadian farmer and political figure in Ontario
 Daniel Harcourt Galbraith (1878–1968), member of the Legislative Assembly of Alberta
 Daniel Murray Bayne Galbraith (1895–1921), World War I flying ace
 Danny Galbraith (born 1990), Scottish footballer